Galeazzo Alessi (1512 – 30 December 1572) was an Italian architect from Perugia, known throughout Europe for his distinctive style based on his enthusiasm for ancient architecture. He studied drawing for civil and military architecture under the direction of Giovanni Battista Caporali.

For a number of years he lived in Genoa. He was involved in the lay-out of the streets and the restoration of the city walls, as well as being responsible for many of its impressive palazzi, now a part of the World Heritage List. His work can be found in many other Italian cities, including in Ferrara, Bologna, Naples and Milan, where he designed the facade of Santa Maria presso San Celso. With Vignola, he designed the Basilica of Santa Maria degli Angeli in Assisi, the seventh largest Christian church at the time. Elsewhere in Europe, he designed churches and palaces in France, Germany and Flanders. He produced designs for El Escorial in Spain, but age and health prevented him from carrying them out.

Selected works

Perugia 
 Rocca Paolina, remodelling
 Loggia at the Oratorio di S. Angelo della Pace
 S. Maria del Popolo (Camera di Commercio)
 Loggia for the Palazzo dei Priori, remodelling
 Convent of Santa Giuliana (S. Caterina)
 Portale of the Villa del Leone
 Doorway in the southern flank of the Duomo
 Works for San Pietro

Assisi
 Basilica of Santa Maria degli Angeli
 Tabernacle of San Francesco (original design in the Metropolitan Museum of Art)
 Works in the Cathedral of San Rufino

Genoa
 Villa Giustiniani-Cambiaso, Albaro
 Basilica of S. Maria Assunta, Carignano
 Porta del Molo (Porta Siberia), inserted in the city walls
 Cupola of St. Lawrence Cathedral
 Villa delle Peschiere
 Villa Grimaldi-Sauli in Bisagno
 Proposals for the palazzi in the Strada Nuova

Milan 
 Palazzo Marino (Municipio di Milano), for the Genoese Tommaso Marino.
 San Barnaba
 Auditorium of the Scuole Canobiane
 Santa Maria presso San Celso
 San Raffaele
 Various projects in the Duomo di Milano, including the monument of the Arcimboldi.

Sacro Monte di Varallo (Vercelli)
 City plan

Rome
Unexecuted designs for the Church of the Gesù

References
Rossi, Di Galeazzo Alessi memorie (Perugia, 1873)
 Emmina De Negri, Galeazzo Alessi : architetto a Genova, (Quaderni dell'Istituto di storia dell'arte dell'Università di Genova, number 1, (Genoa) 1957).
 Galeazzo Alessi e l'architettura del Cinquecento, atti del convegno internazionale di studi : Genoa, 16–20 April 1974, (Genoa 1975)
 R. L. Torrijos, "Un testamento dimenticato di Galeazzo Alessi", in Architettura, storia e documenti, 1 (1985:97-100)

External links

1512 births
1572 deaths
16th-century Italian architects
People from Perugia